The Stanley Correctional Institution is a state prison for men located in Stanley, Chippewa County, Wisconsin, owned and operated by the Wisconsin Department of Corrections.  A maximum capacity of 1500 inmates are held at medium security.  

This facility was constructed in 1998 as a joint venture between the city of Stanley and the Dominion Corporation, then bought by the state in 2001.

References

Prisons in Wisconsin
Buildings and structures in Chippewa County, Wisconsin
1998 establishments in Wisconsin